The Republican Party of India (Gawai) is a political party in India. It is a splinter group of the  Republican Party of India. The leaders are former Governor of Kerala R. S. Gavai and his son Rajendra Gawai.The current President of the Republican party of India (Gawai) is S . Rajendran, former Member of Legislative assembly Karnataka. It is a constituent of the previous ruling United Progressive Alliance. Its presence is limited to Maharashtra.

In 2009 all factions of RPI except Prakash Ambedkar's Bharipa Bahujan Mahasangha reunited to form a united Republican Party of India. RPI (Gawai) was a part of that but later split again.

Republican Party of India
Political parties in Maharashtra
Dalit politics
Ambedkarite political parties
Political parties with year of establishment missing